The discography of Wu-Tang Clan leader RZA consists of four studio albums, two compilation albums, one instrumental album, 2 EP's and five singles.

Albums

Studio albums

Collaboration albums

Compilation albums

Instrumental albums

Soundtracks

Extended plays

Singles

Other charted songs

Guest appearances

See also 
 RZA production discography
 Wu-Tang Clan discography

References

Hip hop discographies
Discographies of American artists